Nathan McBeth (born ) is a South African rugby union player for Glasgow Warriors in the United Rugby Championship. His regular position is loosehead prop and he has represented both South Africa and Scotland at youth level.

Rugby Union career

Professional career

McBeth signed for Glasgow Warriors on 24 October 2021. McBeth stated: "I'm very thankful for the opportunity to join the Warriors. It will be an honour to represent them for the next few years. I can’t wait to meet the team and start to train with them. It’s a dream come true for me. Glasgow has always stood out for me because of the exciting brand of rugby that they play and I’m very excited to become a part of that."

McBeth made his competitive debut as a replacement in the away match against Benetton Treviso on 27 November 2021. He became Glasgow Warrior No. 337.

International career

McBeth represented South Africa at Under-18 level, playing for the South Africa Schools team in the Under-19 International Series in 2016. At the start of 2018, he represented the Scotland Under-20 team at the 2018 Six Nations Under 20s Championship, and a few months later, he played for the South Africa Under-20 team at the 2018 World Rugby Under 20 Championship.

References

External links
 
 

1998 births
Alumni of Monument High School
Living people
Glasgow Warriors players
Golden Lions players
Lions (United Rugby Championship) players
Rugby union players from Welkom
Rugby union props
Scottish rugby union players
South Africa Under-20 international rugby union players
South African people of Scottish descent
South African rugby union players
White South African people